Dry bar may refer to:
 An alcohol-free bar
 Drybar, a California-based chain of salons